Third Commission of the House of Representatives, more commonly known as Third Commission, is one of eleven commissions for the 2019-2024 period, within the People's Representative Council of Indonesia. The commission has the scope of tasks in the fields of law, human rights, and security.

Scope and duties 
Like other commissions, the First Commission has duties in the fields of:

 Law.
 Human rights.
 Security.

Membership

Composition

Leadership

Members

References 

Commissions of the People's Representative Council